This is a list of 1990 British incumbents.

Government
 Monarch
 Head of State – Elizabeth II, Queen of the United Kingdom (1952–2022)

 Prime Minister
 Head of Government – Margaret Thatcher, Prime Minister of the United Kingdom (1979–1990)
 Head of Government – John Major, Prime Minister of the United Kingdom (1990–1997)
First Lord of the Treasury
 Margaret Thatcher, First Lord of the Treasury (1979–1990)
 John Major, First Lord of the Treasury (1990–1997)
Chancellor of the Exchequer
 John Major, Chancellor of the Exchequer (1989–1990)
 Norman Lamont, Chancellor of the Exchequer (1990–1993)
Second Lord of the Treasury
 John Major, Second Lord of the Treasury (1989–1990)
 Norman Lamont, Second Lord of the Treasury (1990–1993)
Secretary of State for Foreign and Commonwealth Affairs
 Douglas Hurd, Secretary of State for Foreign and Commonwealth Affairs (1989–1995)
Secretary of State for the Home Department
 David Waddington, Secretary of State for the Home Department (1989–1990)
 Kenneth Baker, Secretary of State for the Home Department (1990–1992)
Secretary of State for Transport
 Cecil Parkinson, Secretary of State for Transport (1989–1990)
 Malcolm Rifkind, Secretary of State for Transport (1990–1992)
Secretary of State for Scotland
 Malcolm Rifkind, Secretary of State for Scotland (1986–1990)
 Ian Lang, Secretary of State for Scotland (1990–1995)
Secretary of State for Health
 Kenneth Clarke, Secretary of State for Health (1988–1990)
 William Waldegrave, Secretary of State for Health (1990–1992)
Secretary of State for Northern Ireland
 Peter Brooke, Secretary of State for Northern Ireland (1989–1992)
Secretary of State for Defence
 Tom King, Secretary of State for Defence (1989–1992)
Secretary of State for Trade and Industry
 Nicholas Ridley, Secretary of State for Trade and Industry (1989–1990)
 Peter Lilley, Secretary of State for Trade and Industry (1990–1992)
Secretary of State for Education and Science
 John MacGregor, Secretary of State for Education and Science (1989–1990)
 Kenneth Clarke, Secretary of State for Education and Science (1990–1992)
Secretary of State for Wales
 Peter Walker, Secretary of State for Wales (1987–1990)
 David Hunt, Secretary of State for Wales (1990–1993)
Lord Privy Seal
 John Ganzoni, 2nd Baron Belstead, Lord Privy Seal (1988–1990)
 David Waddington, Baron Waddington, Lord Privy Seal (1990–1992)
Leader of the House of Commons
 Sir Geoffrey Howe, Leader of the House of Commons (1989–1990)
 John MacGregor, Leader of the House of Commons (1990–1992)
Lord President of the Council
 Sir Geoffrey Howe, Lord President of the Council (1989–1990)
 John MacGregor, Lord President of the Council (1990–1992)
Lord Chancellor
 James Mackay, Baron Mackay of Clashfern, Lord Chancellor (1987–1997)
Secretary of State for Social Security
 Tony Newton, Secretary of State for Social Security (1989–1992)
Chancellor of the Duchy of Lancaster
 Kenneth Baker, Chancellor of the Duchy of Lancaster (1989–1990)
 Chris Patten, Chancellor of the Duchy of Lancaster (1990–1992)

Religion
 Archbishop of Canterbury
 Robert Runcie, Archbishop of Canterbury (1980–1991)
 Archbishop of York
 John Habgood, Archbishop of York (1983–1995)

1990
Leaders
British incumbents